Ode-Omu is a town in the present Osun State, Nigeria, established in 1900 sequel to implementation of relocation treaty signed between the Ibadan (Oyo) and Ife in 1886. This place is situated in Ayedaade, Osun, Nigeria, its geographical coordinates are 7° 32' 0" North, 4° 24' 0" East and its original name (with diacritics) is Ode-Omu. The settlement was established following civil unrest in neighbouring Yoruba cities of Ife and Modakeke in south-western Nigeria. Most of the families in Ode-Omu have links to Modakeke.

The town is well known to travellers in Nigeria as it is located on one of the main routes to Oshogbo, the state capital. It has also received international fame as the hometown of civil rights activist Michael Akintaro and of several other Nigerian politicians, business men and religious leaders, such as Chiefs Olaniyan, Late Alhaji Adeniji, Senator Olayinka Omilani, Engr (Pastor) Adeyemo and Opejin, Senator Akinlabi Olasunkanmi, Dr.(Pastor) Johnson Ade Ǫdęwale, US based clergyman and Dr. Faniran (past Registrar of the Osun State University). Alhaji Omooye Amiola, the Mogaji Akitikori ruling house and Chairman Omanco Constructions. Also, Jelili Adesiyan who was one time a Minister for Police affairs; Late Barrister Salimon Oloriade Olodo, the late jurist, Justice Jones Oyesomi Fawole; Alh. Surajudeen Olusegun Adeyemi, the proprietor of Assanusiyyah College of Education, Ode-Omu; Tele-evangelist Matthew Ashimolowo, the founder of Kings University, Ode-Omu;Pastor Divine Oluwaseun Akinlabu,popular Pastor in Living Faith Church also known as Winners Chapel; Imam Fuad Adeyemi, founder and National Chief Imam of Al-habibiyyah, a multi-task Islamic organization based in Abuja; the late comedian and radio presenter Olugbenga Abefe Adeboye; and Ariyo Muritala Olushekun, the immediate past president of Chartered Institute of Stockbrokers in Nigeria, who also doubles as the proprietor of Capital Assets Limited (a member of the Nigerian Stock Exchange). St. David's Anglican Church was the first Church in the town.
Former Alayeguns included Akinsanya from Wingbolu family, Oke Dudu; Lawuni, Adeyemo and Oyedoyin from Akitikori family of Ijugbe Compound; Raji Adeniji and Bakare Ojo from Lagere; Adefajo, Stephen Adegboyega Ata Fawole and Alhaji Lamidi Oke, a business tycoon, who reigned for about six years till February 4, 2020. On May 18, 2020, the Governor of Osun State approved the appointment of Chief James Alani Oladipupo as the new Alayegun of Ode-Omu. That same day, the new monarch was installed.

The City Anthem

Ode omu l'a gbe bi mi,
Ayegunle dara.
Ilu t'a tedo pelu fe,
Ati bukun orun.
Awa yo gb'oruko re ga,
Nibikibi t'a wa.

A wa lati Modakeke,
Lati d'ominira.
Pelu awon agba mefa,
A nj'oba l'ajeyika.
B'ori ilakaka wa yi,
A gb'ade t'o l'ogo.

Itesiwaju l'a nle pa,
A nna wo a nna ra.
Emi isokan ti gb'ile,
Ayo kun okan wa.
Eko at'togban at'oye,
Fun awon omo wa.

E ho, e yo arakunrin,
Ati arabinrin.
Ko le re wa, ko le su wa
N'nu ere ije wa
Titi Odeomu wa yi,
Yo d'olokiki nla.
Amin.

External links
Wilmer, Val. Obituary: Michael Akintaro. The Guardian, 7 Oct. 2000. Retrieved 24 Nov. 2006.
Senator Akinlabi Olasunkanmi, Nigerian Senate, 2005. 
Pastor: Matthew Ashimolowo, Kingsway International Christian Centre, London 
 https://web.archive.org/web/20100221210303/http://www.osunstate.gov.ng/ Osun State
Pastor (Dr) Johnson Ade Ǫdęwale : Christ Apostolic Church, Calvary Assembly, Boston USA.(*http://www.caccalvary.com) 	
ADEYEMI SIRAJUDEEN.asp PROPRIETOR: , ASSANUSIYYAH COLLEGE OF EDUCATION, ODEOMU OSUN STATE (www.asscoed.com)
Prophet: Ayodele Oyedele, The Word Prayer Ministries, God's Favour Assembly, Ikorodu, Lagos, Nigeria.
Faosiy Abiodun Adebayo (Chairman, Fasconet IT Solutions & Fasconet Table Water)
Olaniyan Tope Waliyu ( Principal Partner OYTK CONSTRUCTION COMPANY LTD)
http://www.maplandia.com/nigeria/osun/ayedaade/ode-omu/
Engr. Rauf T. A. (Executive Assistance to the President of Oduduwa University Ipetumodu) A civil engineer and an entrepreneur.
 Oseni Olatunji (A native of Ode-Omu and an IT Professional base in Lagos, Nigeria)

 Dr Olanrewaju Sharafa a UK based Nigerian Chartered Accountant. A Council Member & National Treasurer Institute of Corporate & Public Sector Professionals of Nigeria.  
 Raheem Gafar Olueju (Chairman, Olawumi communication centre. Abuja)
https://thenationonlineng.net/breaking-alayegun-of-Ode-Omu-dies/

Populated places in Osun State
Towns in Yorubaland